Robert Swain Gifford (December 23, 1840 – January 15, 1905) was an American landscape painter. He was influenced by the Barbizon school.

Early life and education

Gifford was born on Nonamesset Island, in the Elizabeth Islands, When he was 2 he moved with his family to the New Bedford area, and he attended public schools in New Bedford. When Gifford was a teen, the Dutch painter Albertus Van Beest arrived in New Bedford, and the two collaborated on ship paintings.

Career

Gifford opened a studio in Boston in 1864. Two years later he moved to New York City. In 1867 he was named an Associate of the National Academy of Design and in 1878 he became a full member. He travelled and painted in Oregon and California, then left for Europe, where he visited Great Britain, France, Italy and Spain. Before returning to the U.S. he travelled to Morocco and Egypt. He was joined by fellow artists such as Louis Comfort Tiffany, and painted some subjects from those regions. 
Much of his work focuses on the landscapes of New England. He, along with Victorian contemporaries from the White Mountain and Hudson River Schools, helped immortalize the majestic cliffs of Grand Manan in the Bay of Fundy. His painting from the island, Pettes Cove, is illustrative of his masterful marine work. In 1867, he was elected into the National Academy of Design as an Associate member and became a full member in 1878.

In 1876 he was a medal winner at the Philadelphia Centennial Exhibition and at the International Exposition in Paris in 1889. In 1899, he was an artist on the famous Harriman Alaska Expedition. Gifford died at his home in New York City in 1905.

Some of his works hang in the most prominent galleries in the USA, including the Fine Arts Museums of San Francisco, the Metropolitan Museum of Art, New York, and the Smithsonian American Art Museum, Washington DC. He was a member of the Society of American Artists.

Gallery

Oil paintings

Prints

References

External links
 
Biography of Gifford on the Smithsonian site
Image of Gifford's Near the Coast on the Metropolitan Museum of Art site

1840 births
1905 deaths
19th-century American painters
20th-century American painters
American landscape painters
American male painters
National Academy of Design members
Orientalist painters
Painters from Massachusetts
People from Grand Manan
People from Dukes County, Massachusetts
19th-century American male artists
20th-century American male artists